Amedeo Benedetti (born 25 October 1991) is an Italian footballer. He plays for  club Pordenone.

Biography

Chievo–Vicenza swap and loans
Benedetti started his career at Serie A club Chievo.

On 24 June 2010, 5 days before the closure of 2009–10 financial year of "A.C. Chievo-Verona S.r.l." and "Vicenza Calcio S.p.A.", Benedetti was swapped with Mattia Minesso. Both players were valued €2 million, thus no cash involved. Both club also retained 50% registration rights for €1M as part of co-ownership deal. Benedetti signed a 4-year contract. The deal made both club had an immediately selling profit on both players, a speculative future re-sell revenue and/or speculative players performance and a heavy cost in the future as amortization.

Both players were loaned to Lega Pro clubs. Benedetti joined Pro Patria of the second division of Lega Pro (ex-Serie C) in July 2010. Benedetti was the starting defender of Pro Patria with 27 league appearances.

Chievo return, loans
In June 2011, both players returned to their mother clubs with the same price (€1M for 50% rights), made that financial year in fact no amortization expense of €500,000 to deteriorate the situation but in the future did. That month, Chievo also swapped with other clubs as a trick to "fix" the financial situation.

Chievo failed to find a new buyer for Benedetti or may led to immediate negative financial impact. and Chievo chose to amortize the €2M in installments in the lifespan of his contract, despite it was impaired with the benefit (income or performance) generated by the player. Since 2011, Benedetti had spent 6 seasons on loan from Chievo.

Pisa (loan)
Benedetti spent his 2011–12 season at Lega Pro Prima Divisione club Pisa.

Benedetti was the starting left-back (wing-back) of Pisa in 4–4–2 or 3–5–2 formation.

In July 2012 the loan was renewed.

Lumezzane (loan)
On 9 July 2013 he was signed by Lumezzane. The loan was renewed again on 17 July 2014.

Reggina (loan)
On 2 February 2015 he was signed by Reggina along with Chievo team-mate Kevin Magri.

Cittadella (loans)
On 24 July 2015 Benedetti, Yusupha Bobb and Lamin Jallow were signed by A.S. Cittadella in temporary deals. On 5 July 2016 the loan was renewed.

Cittadella 
In summer 2017 he joined Cittadella in a definitive deal.

Pordenone
On 22 July 2022, Benedetti moved to Pordenone on a two-year deal.

Notes

References

External links
 Football.it Profile 
 

1991 births
People from Rovereto
Sportspeople from Trentino
Living people
Italian footballers
Association football fullbacks
L.R. Vicenza players
Aurora Pro Patria 1919 players
A.C. ChievoVerona players
Pisa S.C. players
F.C. Lumezzane V.G.Z. A.S.D. players
Reggina 1914 players
A.S. Cittadella players
Pordenone Calcio players
Serie B players
Serie C players
Footballers from Trentino-Alto Adige/Südtirol
21st-century Italian people